Early phenomenology refers to the early phase of the phenomenological movement, from the 1890s until the Second World War.  The figures associated with the early phenomenology are Edmund Husserl and his followers and students, particularly the members of the Göttingen and Munich Circles, as well as a number of other students of Carl Stumpf and Theodor Lipps, and excludes the later existential phenomenology inspired by Martin Heidegger. Early phenomenology can be divided into two theoretical camps: realist phenomenology, and transcendental or constitutive phenomenology.

Alongside Husserl, the other editors of the Jahrbuch für Philosophie und phänomenologische Forschung, Moritz Geiger, Alexander Pfänder, Adolf Reinach, and Max Scheler, are typically identified as the fathers of early phenomenology.

The end of the early phenomenology is marked by a series of historical events, including the death of Husserl in 1938, the increased influence of Heidegger, and the outbreak of the Second World War which saw the scattering and death of a number of the early phenomenologists.  The end of the early phase of the phenomenological movement led by Husserl is foreshadowed by the differences between Husserl and Heidegger concerning the Encyclopædia Britannica article on 'Phenomenology'.

Phenomenology prior to the Logical Investigations
While Husserl's Logical Investigations are considered the foundational text in phenomenology, it is not the first.  Theodor Lipps' student Alexander Pfänder published his Phänomenologie des Wollens: eine psychologische analyse in 1900, based on his dissertation of 1899, which was a work in phenomenology conceived as descriptive psychology.  During the 1890s, Husserl's phenomenology was in its developmental stages.  The origins of Husserl's phenomenology can be traced back to his unpublished essay Intentional Objects, which dates as far back as 1894.

The Logical Investigations (1900/01) and the Munich Invasion
Shortly before his appointment as professor at the University of Göttingen in 1901, Husserl published the first edition of his Logical Investigations.  In Volume I of this work, the Prolegomena to Pure Logic, Husserl presents his now famous polemic against logical psychologism - the attempt to reduce the laws of logic to psychological laws.  The term 'phenomenology' only appears once in the first edition of Volume I, in a footnote to section 57.  Volume II introduces Husserl's phenomenology, which he characterizes as both a science of essences and as a descriptive psychology that aims to serve as a groundwork for a radical critique of knowledge. In outlining the phenomenological project of the Logical Investigations, Husserl writes:

It is also in the opening pages of Volume II where Husserl gives his famous battle-cry, "back to the things themselves."

The Logical Investigations gained widespread attention in Europe, and students began to come to Göttingen specifically to study with Husserl.  Of particular importance was the reception of the Logical Investigations by the Psychological association at the University of Munich.  In his book, Husserl had been critical of the psychologist Theodor Lipps.  A number of Lipps' students agreed with the criticisms made by Husserl, and were drawn to his phenomenology.  Starting with Johannes Daubert, many of Lipps' students left Munich and headed to Göttingen in order to study with Husserl. This event is often referred to as the Munich invasion of Göttingen, and is considered to be the starting point of the phenomenological movement proper. In the summer of 1907, former Munich student Theodor Conrad established a student group in Göttingen to mirror the one he had been a part of in Munich, with the expressed purpose of studying phenomenology.    At the time there had been a number of students working with Husserl in Göttingen, known as his Urschüler, and with them Conrad formed the Göttingen Circle.   In 1909, Adolf Reinach took up a position as Privatdozent in Göttingen, followed shortly thereafter by Max Scheler in 1910, who had lost his teaching position in Munich.  Around this same time, Alexandre Koyre, Jean Hering, Edith Stein, and Roman Ingarden joined the young group of phenomenologists.

Ideas I and the realism/idealism debate
While phenomenology as it was presented in the Logical Investigations was flourishing in both Göttingen and Munich, Husserl was moving toward a conception of phenomenology as a form of transcendental idealism.  In 1905, Husserl traveled to Seefeld for his summer vacation, and was visited by Pfänder and Daubert.  In the manuscripts from this time, we find the emergence of the phenomenological reduction and Husserl's first moves toward transcendental idealism. Shortly after the vacation, Daubert penned a manuscript divided into two parts: one on transcendental philosophy, and the other on phenomenology.  Upon his return to Göttingen, Husserl began a serious re-reading of Kant, and in 1907, made his new conception of phenomenology public in a series of five lectures titled, The Idea of Phenomenology.  The turn away from the descriptive psychology and realist phenomenology outlined in the Logical Investigations was completed with the publication of Ideas Pertaining to a Pure Phenomenology and to a Phenomenological Philosophy in the inaugural edition the Jahrbuch.

Many of Husserl's students, particularly those that he shared with Reinach, resisted the turn to idealism.  The phenomenologists who had remained with Lipps in Munich championed realist phenomenology in opposition to Husserl.

The Urschüler
 William Ernest Hocking
 Heinrich Hofmann
 David Katz
 Theodor Lessing
 Dietrich Mahnke
 Karl Neuhaus
 Wilhelm Schapp

The Munich Circle
 Maximilian Beck
 Theodor Conrad
 Hedwig Conrad-Martius
 Johannes Daubert
 Moritz Geiger
 Dietrich von Hildebrand
 Alexander Pfänder
 Adolf Reinach
 Max Scheler

The Göttingen Circle
 Winthrop Pickard Bell
 Siegfried Hamburger
 Jean Hering
 Roman Ingarden
 Fritz Kaufmann
 Alexandre Koyré
 Hans Lipps
 Gustav Shpet
 Kurt Stavenhagen
 Edith Stein
 Alfred von Sybel

The unorthodoxer Schüler
Dietrich Heinrich Kerler
Paul Ferdinand Linke

The Freiburger Schüler
Dorion Cairns
Theodor Celms
Eugen Fink
Aron Gurwitsch
Emmanuel Levinas
Gerda Walther

References

Bibliography 
 Josef Seifert and Cheikh Mbacke Gueye (Eds.), Anthologie der Realistischen Phänomenologie, 2009.
 Herbert Spiegelberg, The Phenomenological Movement: A Historical Introduction, 1982
 Helmut Kuhn and Ederhard Avé-Lallemant (Eds.), Die Münchener Phänomenologie, Phaenomenologica 65, 1976.
 Bruno Leclercq, Sébastien Richard, Denis Seron (Eds.), Objects and Pseudo-Objects: Ontological Desert and Jungle from Brentano to Carnap, 2014.
 Kimberly Baltzer-Jaray, "Introduction," Quaestiones Disputatae: Selected Papers on the Early Phenomenology of Munich and Gottingen, 3:1 (2012)
 Marvin Farber, The Foundation of Phenomenology: Edmund Husserl And the Quest for a Rigorous Science of Philosophy, 1943.
 Robin Rollinger, Austrian Phenomenology:  Brentano, Husserl, Meinong, and Others on Mind and Object. Frankfurt: Ontos Verlag, 2008.
  Barry Smith, "Realistic Phenomenology”, in L. Embree (ed.), Encyclopedia of Phenomenology, Dordrecht/Boston/London: Kluwer, 1997, pp. 586–590. 

Phenomenology
Western philosophy
Philosophical schools and traditions